Mustafa Ahmad Hassan (born 10 February 1990, in Najaf) is an Iraqi-Danish footballer who currently plays for Gjelleråsen.

Early life
Hassan came to Denmark from Iraq at the age of thirteen, settling in Bornholm. He obtained a Danish passport in December 2008.

Career
After his arrival in 2003 in Denmark, he joined the Danish football team FC Bornholm where he stayed for 3 years. He then moved to Brøndby IF in the summer 2006. He played his first professional game on 30 October 2008 in the Danish Cup against Holstebro BK, and his first league game in the Danish Superliga was on 5 October 2008 against Odense BK.

On August 31, 2010, he signed with Danish club HB Køge. On 23 February 2011 left his club HB Køge and signed with his former Brøndby IF teammate Philip Pedersen for Swedish club Kristianstads FF. His contract with the Swedish club was terminated on May 19, 2011. He didn't play a single match for the club.

On September 8, 2011 he signed a contract with Svebølle B&I in the Danish 2nd Divisions.

On February 4, 2012 he signed a contract with Næstved Boldklub. He played 11 games at Næstved, but at the end of the season the club was relegated, and Hassan returned to his former club Svebølle B&I. A month after joining Svebølle Hassan was offered a contract at Hobro IK, where he would be reunited with his former manager from Næstved, Klavs Rasmussen.

Rasmussen resigned as manager of Hobro in January 2013, and two months later Hassan decided to move back to Svebølle B&I for a third spell at the club.

References 

1990 births
Living people
Danish men's footballers
Danish expatriate men's footballers
Brøndby IF players
HB Køge players
Hobro IK players
Hamarkameratene players
Skeid Fotball players
Iraqi emigrants to Denmark
Expatriate footballers in Sweden
Danish expatriate sportspeople in Sweden
Expatriate footballers in Norway
Danish expatriate sportspeople in Norway
Association football forwards
Norwegian First Division players